Chick-fil-A (a play on the American English pronunciation of "filet") is an American fast food restaurant chain and the largest chain specializing in chicken sandwiches. Headquartered in College Park, Georgia, Chick-fil-A operates 2,898 restaurants across 48 states, as well as in the District of Columbia and Puerto Rico. The company also has operations in Canada, and previously had restaurants in the United Kingdom and South Africa. The restaurant serves breakfast before transitioning to its lunch and dinner menu.  also offers customers catered selections from its menu for special events.

Many of the company's values are influenced by the Christian religious beliefs of its late founder, S. Truett Cathy (1921–2014), a devout Southern Baptist. Reflecting a commitment to Sunday Sabbatarianism, all  restaurants are closed for business on Sundays, as well as on Thanksgiving and Christmas Day; to honor the Western Christian liturgical season of Lent,  promotes fish sandwiches in respect of abstinence from meat that characterizes that part of the Church Year. The company's conservative opposition to same-sex marriage has been the subject of public controversy, though the company has begun to loosen its stance on this issue.

History

The chain's origin can be traced to the Dwarf Grill (now the Dwarf House), a restaurant opened by S. Truett Cathy, the chain's former chairman and CEO, in 1946. The restaurant is located in Hapeville, Georgia, a suburb of Atlanta, and is near the location of the now-demolished Ford Motor Company Atlanta Assembly Plant, for many years a source of many of the restaurant's patrons.

In 1961, after 15 years in the fast food business, Cathy found a pressure-fryer that could cook the chicken sandwich in the same amount of time it took to cook a fast-food hamburger. Following this discovery, he registered the name Chick-fil-A, Inc. The company's trademarked slogan, "We Didn't Invent the Chicken, Just the Chicken Sandwich," refers to their flagship menu item, the Chick-fil-A chicken sandwich. Though Chick-Fil-A was the first national chain to make a quick-service, fried chicken sandwich its flagship item, several sources have demonstrated that Cathy's much broader claim to have "invented the chicken sandwich," which is referenced in the company's slogan and has been repeatedly featured in press materials, is untrue.

From 1964 to 1967, the sandwich was licensed to over fifty eateries, including Waffle House and the concession stands of the new Houston Astrodome. The Chick-Fil-A sandwich was withdrawn from sale at other restaurants when the first standalone location opened in 1967, in the food court of the Greenbriar Mall in Atlanta.

During the 1970s and early 1980s, the chain expanded by opening new locations in suburban malls' food courts. The first freestanding location was opened April 16, 1986, on North Druid Hills Road in Atlanta, Georgia, and the company began to focus more on this stand-alone type unit rather than on the food court type. Although it has expanded outward from its original geographic base, most new restaurants are located in Southern suburban areas.

Since 1997, the Atlanta-based company has been the title sponsor of the Peach Bowl, an annual college football bowl game played in Atlanta on New Year's Eve. Chick-fil-A also is a key sponsor of the SEC and the ACC of college athletics.

In 2008, Chick-fil-A became the first fast-food restaurant to become completely trans-fat free.

In October 2015, the company opened a three-story  restaurant in Manhattan that became the largest free-standing Chick-fil-A in the country at that time.

On December 17, 2017, Chick-fil-A broke their tradition and opened on a Sunday to prepare meals for passengers left stranded during the power outage at Atlanta Hartsfield-Jackson International Airport, and on January 13, 2019, a Chick-fil-A franchise in Mobile, Alabama, opened on Sunday to honor a birthday wish of a 14-year-old boy with cerebral palsy and autism.

On February 13, 2023 they began offering their first non-meat sandwich, a breaded cauliflower sandwich.

Business model

Chick-fil-A's business strategy involves a focus on a small menu and on customer service.  While many  fast food chains often expand their menu offerings to attempt to attract new customers, Chick-fil-A's business model is to remain focused on selling chicken sandwiches. The name capital A is meant to indicate that their chicken is "grade A top quality". In addition, an emphasis on customer service has allowed Chick-fil-A to consistently lead the fast food industry in customer satisfaction. These factors are seen as the reason for Chick-fil-A's massive growth in the United States.

Chick-fil-A retains ownership of each restaurant. Chick-fil-A selects the restaurant location and builds it. Chick-fil-A franchisees need only a $10,000 initial investment to become an operator. Each operator is handpicked and goes through a rigorous training program; the interviews plus training can take months and is not an easy process. Chick-fil-A states on their site:

"This is not the right opportunity for you if you:
 Are seeking a passive investment in a business.
 Want to sell property to Chick-fil-A, Inc.
 Are requesting that Chick-fil-A, Inc. build at a specified location.
 Are seeking multi-unit franchise opportunities."

Chick-fil-A grossed an average of $4.8 million per restaurant in 2016, despite opening only 6 days a week, the highest sales of all fast food restaurants in the United States. (Whataburger was second with $2.7 million per restaurant average).

In 2019, Chick-fil-A reported $11.3 billion in sales in the United States, behind only McDonald's with $40.4 billion in sales in 2019.

To respond to  Chick-fil-A's massive success, competing fried chicken chain Popeyes introduced a fried chicken sandwich in 2019, starting the Chicken Sandwich Wars, with many more fast food chains eventually following Popeyes.

Corporate culture
S. Truett Cathy was a devout Southern Baptist; his religious beliefs had a major impact on the company. The company's official statement of corporate purpose says that the business exists "To glorify God by being a faithful steward of all that is entrusted to us. To have a positive influence on all who come in contact with Chick-fil-A." Cathy opposed the company becoming public for religious and personal reasons.

Their website states, "The Chick-fil-A culture and service tradition in our Restaurants is to treat every person with honor, dignity and respect –regardless of their belief, race, creed, sexual orientation or gender."

Sunday closure
The founder's beliefs are responsible for the chain's most well-known and distinctive feature: in accordance with the Christian doctrine of first-day Sabbatarianism, all Chick-fil-A locations (both corporate owned and franchised) are closed on Sundays, as well as on Thanksgiving and Christmas. Cathy states as the final step in his Five-Step recipe for Business Success "I was not so committed to financial success that I was willing to abandon my principles and priorities. One of the most visible examples of this is our decision to close on Sunday. Our decision to close on Sunday was our way of honoring God and of directing our attention to things that mattered more than our business."

In an interview with ABC News's Nightline, Truett's son Dan T. Cathy told reporter Vicki Mabrey that the company is also closed on Sundays because "by the time Sunday came, he was just worn out. And Sunday was not a big trading day, anyway, at the time. So he was closed that first Sunday and we've been closed ever since. He figured if he didn't like working on Sundays, that other people didn't either." The younger Cathy also quoted his father as saying, "I don't want to ask people to do that what I am not willing to do myself."

Chick-fil-A's Sunday closures extend to non-traditional locations. In addition to countless shopping malls and airports, a Chick-fil-A location at Mercedes-Benz Stadium in Atlanta is closed on Sundays despite the fact that its main tenant, the Atlanta Falcons, plays most of their home games on Sundays. The location is open when the Falcons have a Monday night, Thursday night or Saturday home game, as well as non-Sunday home games of Atlanta United FC and other events at the stadium. The Chick-fil-A remained closed for Super Bowl LIII. On Sundays, the digital signs are flipped and concessionaire Levy Restaurants sells nonbranded food and drinks at the location.

Lenten observance
To honor the Western Christian liturgical season of Lent, Chick-fil-A promotes fish sandwiches in respect of the fact that this part of the Church Year is associated with the Friday Fast, with many practicing Christian vegetarianism throughout all the forty days of Lent.

Serving chicken without antibiotics
According to the Food and Drug Administration (FDA), antibiotics used in livestock, many of which are also used to treat humans, have contributed to the rise of dangerous bacteria. In December 2012, the FDA announced plans to phase out certain antibiotics in the food production industry.

In February 2014, Chick-fil-A announced plans to serve chicken raised without antibiotics in its restaurants nationwide within five years. Chick-fil-A was the first quick service restaurant to set forth a plan and commit to serving only poultry raised without antibiotics. They achieved this goal in May 2019.

Recipe changes
In 2011, food blogger and activist Vani Hari wrote a post titled "Chick-fil-A or Chemical Fil-A?" on her website, FoodBabe.com. She asserted that Chick-fil-A sandwiches contained nearly 100 ingredients, including peanut oil with tert-butylhydroquinone (TBHQ), a preservative for unsaturated vegetable oils. In October 2012, Chick-fil-A invited Hari to meet with company executives at its headquarters. In December 2013, Chick-fil-A notified Hari that it had eliminated the dye Yellow No. 5 and had reduced the sodium content in its chicken soup. The company also said that it is testing a peanut oil that does not contain TBHQ and that it would start testing sauces and dressings made without high-fructose corn syrup in 2014.

International locations

Canada

In September 1994, Chick-fil-A opened its first location outside of the United States inside a student center food court at the University of Alberta in Edmonton, Alberta, Canada. This location did not perform very well and was closed within two or three years. The company returned to the province of Alberta by opening an outlet at the Calgary International Airport in Calgary in May 2014. This restaurant closed in 2019.

In July 2018, Chick-fil-A announced plans to expand within Canada by opening a new restaurant in Toronto, Ontario, in 2019. That location opened on September 6, 2019 in the Yonge and Bloor Street area, marked by protests criticizing the company's violation of animal rights and "history of supporting anti-LGBTQ causes". Chick-fil-A announced that it would open two other locations in Toronto during 2019, and 12 additional stores in the Greater Toronto Area over the subsequent five years. The chain's second Toronto location opened at the Yorkdale Shopping Centre in January 2020.

The company expanded to other areas of Ontario in 2021, opening standalone locations with drive-thrus in Kitchener and Windsor, in August and October respectively.

South Africa
In August 1996, Chick-fil-A opened its first location outside of North America by building a restaurant in Durban, South Africa. A second location was opened in Johannesburg in November 1997. Since neither of the South African locations was profitable, both of these locations were closed in 2001.

United Kingdom 
A Chick-fil-A operated in Edinburgh during Spring 2018. On October 10, 2019, Chick-fil-A returned to Europe, with the opening of a store at The Oracle shopping centre in Reading, UK. The store closed in March 2020 after The Oracle opted not to continue the lease of the location beyond the six-month pilot period in the face of continued protests over the chain's anti-LGBTQ stance.

In February 2019, Chick-fil-A opened a store on a 12-month pilot scheme in Aviemore, Scotland. The store was closed in January 2020 amidst protest and controversy from locals and customers regarding the chain's former donations to charities supporting anti-LGBT rights causes. The reason for closing however was not the controversy (only 1,000 signatures were gained in a petition) but the pop-up nature of the experiment and the competition from more established outlets.

Expansion to Asia and Europe 
Chick-fil-A CEO Andrew Cathy announced in March2023 that it planned to open restaurants in both Asia and Europe by 2026, and was set to expand to a total of five overseas markets by 2030. The Wall Street Journal reported that it was seeking countries with "stable economies, dense populations, and a demand for chicken".

Planned locations

In July 2018, Chick-fil-A announced it would be opening its first location in Hawaii in Kahului in early 2022, with additional locations in Honolulu and Kapoleo to follow. In December 2020, it was announced the company would open a new location in Puerto Rico. The first Puerto Rican location opened on March 3, 2022 in Bayamón.

Advertising

"Eat Mor Chikin" is the chain's most prominent advertising slogan, created by The Richards Group in 1995. The slogan is often seen in advertisements, featuring Holstein dairy cows that are often seen wearing (or holding) signs that (usually) read "Eat Mor Chikin" in all capital letters. The ad campaign was temporarily halted on January 1, 2004 during a mad cow disease scare, so as not to make the chain seem insensitive or appear to be taking advantage of the scare to increase its sales. Two months later, the cows were put up again. The cows replaced the chain's old mascot, Doodles, an anthropomorphized chicken who still appears as the C on the logo.

Chick-fil-A vigorously protects its intellectual property, sending cease and desist letters to those they think have infringed on their trademarks. The corporation has successfully protested at least 30 instances of the use of an "eat more" phrase, saying that the use would cause confusion of the public, dilute the distinctiveness of their intellectual property, and diminish its value.

A 2011 letter to Vermont artist Bo Muller-Moore who screen prints T-shirts reading: "Eat More Kale" demanded that he cease printing the shirts and turn over his website. The incident drew criticism from Vermont governor Peter Shumlin, and created backlash against what he termed Chick-fil-A's "corporate bullying." On December 11, 2014, Bo Muller-Moore announced that the U.S. Patent Office granted his application to trademark his "Eat More Kale" phrase. A formal announcement of his victory took place on December 12, 2014, with Shumlin and other supporters on the Statehouse steps. His public fight drew regional and national attention, the support of Shumlin, and a team of pro-bono law students from the University of New Hampshire legal clinic.

After 22 years with The Richards Group, Chick-fil-A switched to McCann New York in 2016. Along with the cows, ads included famous people in history in a campaign called "Chicken for Breakfast. It's not as crazy as you think."

Sponsored events
Chick-fil-A Classic
The Chick-fil-A Classic is a high school basketball tournament held in Columbia, South Carolina, featuring nationally ranked players and teams. The tournament is co-sponsored by the Greater Columbia Educational Advancement Foundation (GCEAF), which provides scholarships to high school seniors in the greater Columbia area.

Chick-fil-A Peach Bowl
The Chick-fil-A Peach Bowl, first known as the Peach Bowl until 2006 and renamed Chick-fil-A Peach Bowl in 2014, is a college football bowl game played each year in Atlanta, Georgia.

Chick-fil-A Kickoff Game
The Chick-fil-A Kickoff Game is an annual early-season college football game played at the Mercedes-Benz Stadium in Atlanta, Georgia; before 2017, it was played at the Georgia Dome. It features two highly ranked teams, one of which has always been from the Southeastern Conference. In the 2012 season and again in the 2014 season, the event was expanded to two games. It was also two games in 2017.

Chick-fil-A Peach Bowl Challenge
The Chick-fil-A Peach Bowl Challenge is a premier head coach and celebrity pro-am held each April at Reynold's Plantation on Lake Oconee.

Controversies

Same-sex marriage

Chick-fil-A has donated over $5 million, via the WinShape Foundation, to groups that oppose same-sex marriage.  In response, students at several colleges and universities worked to ban or remove the company's restaurants from their campuses.

In June and July 2012, Chick-fil-A's chief operating officer Dan T. Cathy made several public statements about same-sex marriage, saying that those who "have the audacity to define what marriage is about" were "inviting God's judgment on our nation". Several prominent politicians expressed disapproval. Boston Mayor Thomas Menino and Chicago Alderman Proco "Joe" Moreno said they hoped to block franchise expansion into their areas. The proposed bans drew criticism from liberal pundits, legal experts, and the American Civil Liberties Union. The Jim Henson Company, which had a Pajanimals kids' meal toy licensing arrangement with Chick-fil-A, said it would cease its business relationship, and donate the payment to the Gay & Lesbian Alliance Against Defamation. Chick-fil-A stopped distributing the toys, claiming that unrelated safety concerns had arisen prior to the controversy. Chick-fil-A released a statement on July 31, 2012, saying, "We are a restaurant company focused on food, service, and hospitality; our intent is to leave the policy debate over same-sex marriage to the government and political arena."

In response to the controversy, former Arkansas Governor Mike Huckabee initiated a Chick-fil-A Appreciation Day movement to counter a boycott of Chick-fil-A launched by same-sex marriage activists. Many of the chain's stores reported record levels of customers that day. The United States Federal Aviation Administration also responded to two cities that were preventing Chick-fil-A from opening in their international airport, citing "Federal requirements prohibit airport operators from excluding persons on the basis of religious creed from participating in airport activities that receive or benefit from FAA grant funding."

In April 2018, Chick-fil-A reportedly continued to donate to the Fellowship of Christian Athletes, which opposes gay marriage. In a November 18, 2019 interview, Chick-fil-A president Tim Tassopoulos said the company would stop donating to The Salvation Army and the Fellowship of Christian Athletes.

Drive-through traffic
The popularity of Chick-fil-A's drive-throughs in the United States has led to traffic problems, police interventions, and complaints by neighboring businesses in more than 20 states. The long drive-through lines have been reported to cause traffic backups, blocking emergency vehicles and city buses and increasing the risk of collisions and pedestrian injuries.

Related restaurants

Hapeville Dwarf House
Truett Cathy opened his first restaurant in 1946, The Dwarf Grill – later renamed the Dwarf House – in Hapeville, Georgia, and developed the pressure-cooked chicken breast sandwich there. At the original Chick-fil-A Dwarf Grill, in addition to the full-size entrances, there is also an extra small-sized front door. The original Dwarf House in Hapeville, Georgia is open 24 hours a day, six days a week, except on Sundays, Thanksgiving, and Christmas. The store closes at 10:00 p.m. on Saturday nights, and the day before Thanksgiving and Christmas and reopens at 6 a.m. on Monday mornings and the day after Thanksgiving and Christmas. It has a larger dine-in menu than the other Dwarf House locations as well as an animated seven dwarfs display in the back of the restaurant. It was across the street from the former Ford Motor Company factory called Atlanta Assembly.

Dwarf House
Opened in 1986, Truett's original, full-service restaurants offer a substantial menu and provide customers a choice of table service, walk-up counter service or a drive-thru window. There are currently five of the original eleven Chick-fil-A Dwarf House restaurants still operating in the metro Atlanta area, including Duluth, Riverdale, Jonesboro, Forest Park and Fayetteville.

Truett's Grill
In 1996, the first Truett's Grill was opened in Morrow, Georgia. The second location opened in 2003 in McDonough, Georgia, and a third location opened in 2006 in Griffin, Georgia. Similar to the Chick-fil-A Dwarf Houses, these independently owned restaurants offer traditional, sit-down dining and expanded menu selections in a diner-themed restaurant. In 2017, Chick-fil-A demolished several Dwarf House locations to replace them with Truett's Grill locations.

Truett's Chick-fil-A
Truett's Chick-fil-A is designed in honor of founder S. Truett Cathy.  The restaurant is decorated with family photos and favorite quotes of the restaurant founder. The restaurant offers drive-thru, counter, and sit-down service. The restaurant offers breakfast, lunch and dinner. There are four locations including Newnan, Rome, Stockbridge, and Woodstock, Georgia.

Truett's Luau
Truett Cathy visited Hawaii and loved the experience so much that he wanted to bring Hawaii to Fayetteville Georgia. At the age of 92 he opened Truett's Luau in 2013.  The menu includes island favorites with a southern spin.   The restaurant offers sit down, counter and drive-thru service.

Senior leadership 
Chick-fil-A has been run by the Cathy family since the restaurant chain's founding in 1946; it is currently being led by the third-generation of the Cathy family.

List of chairmen 

 S. Truett Cathy (1946–2013)
 Dan Cathy (2013– )

List of chief executives 

 S. Truett Cathy (1946–2013)
 Dan Cathy (2013–2021)
 Andrew T. Cathy (2021– )

Menu 
Based on data from 2018, the most popular (most ordered) item was the waffle fries followed by soft drinks, chicken nuggets, and the original chicken sandwich. These items should be available at every franchise location with some locations offering the full menu or close to the full menu. The full list of menu items and nutrition information can be found on Chick-fil-A's website.

See also
 List of chicken restaurants

References

External links

 Official website

 
Companies based in Fulton County, Georgia
Fast-food chains of the United States
Fast-food poultry restaurants
Hapeville, Georgia
Economy of the Southeastern United States
Privately held companies based in Georgia (U.S. state)
Restaurants established in 1946
1946 establishments in Georgia (U.S. state)
Cathy family
Chicken chains of the United States